Grunden Rock is a rock  high, surrounded by a group of smaller rocks, lying close east of Hut Cove along the south side of the entrance to Hope Bay, at the northeast end of the Antarctic Peninsula. It was discovered by the Swedish Antarctic Expedition under Otto Nordenskiöld, 1901–04. The Falkland Islands Dependencies Survey in 1945 named the entire group of rocks for Toralf Grunden, a member of the Swedish Expedition who wintered at Hope Bay in 1903, but in 1952 the name was restricted to the largest rock in this group for easier reference to the light beacon established on the main rock by the Argentine government during the previous season.

References

Rock formations of the Trinity Peninsula